Elizabeth Maniscalco, better known by her stage name Elizabeth Rose, is an Australian electronica DJ, record producer and singer-songwriter. Her first single, "Ready", was released in January 2012 to good reviews, with Radar Music marking her as one of the "20 Aussie Indie Bands to Watch in 2012". Elizabeth now goes under the alias 'Brux' and is signed to Dim Mak Records.

In September 2013, Elizabeth Rose was announced the winner of the Qantas Spirit of Youth Music Award.

In October 2013, Elizabeth Rose toured Australia in support of her debut EP The Good Life.

In 2015, Elizabeth Rose teamed up with Australian Marriage Equality (AME) to release the song "Division", which addresses the issue of marriage equality in Australia. The track was co-produced with Dennis Dowlut. For two weeks following its initial release, all proceeds were donated to Australian Marriage Equality (AME).

She has also performed at BigSound (2012, 2013), Sydney's Come Together Festival (2015), and Splendour in the Grass (2015). Elizabeth Rose also performed at New York's annual industry showcase CMJ Music Marathon (2013)

Discography

Studio albums

Extended plays

Singles

Awards and nominations

AIR Awards
The Australian Independent Record Awards (commonly known informally as AIR Awards) is an annual awards night to recognise, promote and celebrate the success of Australia's Independent Music sector.

|-
| AIR Awards of 2017
| Intra
| Best Independent Dance/Electronic Album
| 
|-

References

External links 
 
 
 Tumblr page
 

Living people
Australian people of Italian descent
Australian record producers
Australian DJs
Women DJs
Musicians from Sydney
Australian dance musicians
Australian electronic musicians
Australian women in electronic music
Year of birth missing (living people)
Electronic dance music DJs
Australian women record producers